Noémi Besedes is a Swiss actress and model.

She was television presenter at the start of VIVA Switzerland in 1999.

Filmography

External links
 http://noemibesedes.com/
 https://www.imdb.com/name/nm3072577/
 Der unbekannte Tarantino-Star in: Rheinische Post online - 2010-01-19

1980 births
Living people
Swiss film actresses
Swiss television presenters
Swiss television actresses
Actors from Basel-Stadt
Swiss women television presenters